Deuterocohnia schreiteri is a plant species in the genus Deuterocohnia.

Cultivars
 × Pucohnia 'George Anderson'

References
BSI Cultivar Registry Retrieved 11 October 2009

schreiteri